The discography of the South Korean singer Taeyeon consists of three studio albums, seven extended plays (EPs), forty-one singles (including eight as featured artist and fourteen recorded for soundtracks), and four promotional singles. She debuted as a member of South Korean girl group Girls' Generation in August 2007, and embarked on a solo career in 2015. As a solo singer, Taeyeon has sold over 1,306,885 albums in South Korea as of July 2022.

During her career beginnings, Taeyeon established herself as one of the most renowned vocalists in South Korea with soundtrack recordings for Korean dramas, notably "If" for Hong Gil Dong (2008) and "Can You Hear Me" for Beethoven Virus (2008); the latter helped Taeyeon win the Popularity Award at the 2008 Golden Disk Awards. Referred to as the " Queen", she further recorded popular soundtrack hits including "I Love You" for Athena: Goddess of War (2010), "Missing You like Crazy" for The King 2 Hearts (2012), "Closer" for To the Beautiful You (2012), and "And One" for That Winter, the Wind Blows (2013).

Her debut extended play I (2015) peaked at number two on South Korea's Gaon Album Chart and has sold over 160,000 physical copies. The title track peaked atop the Gaon Digital Chart and has sold over 2.5 million digital units. In February 2016, Taeyeon released "Rain" as the opening single for digital music project SM Station. The single reached number one in South Korea and has sold over 2.5 million copies. Her second EP Why (2016), reached number one in South Korea and spawned two Gaon top-ten singles–"Starlight" and "Why". Taeyeon's first studio album, My Voice (2017), peaked atop the Gaon Album Chart and has sold over 230,000 copies in South Korea. The album features three South Korean top-five singles: the chart-topper "Fine", "11:11", and "Make Me Love You".

Taeyeon further released two South Korean top-five EPs, This Christmas: Winter Is Coming (2017) and Something New (2018), and a Japanese top-ten EP, Voice (2019). Her second studio album, Purpose (2019), debuted at number two in South Korea with first-week sales of 154,000 copies. It includes the singles "Four Seasons" and "Spark", which peaked at numbers one and two on the Gaon Digital Chart, respectively. Her other number-one singles in South Korea include "Like a Star" (with The One, 2010), "Lonely" (with Jonghyun, 2017), and "All About You" for the drama Hotel Del Luna (2019).

Studio albums

Reissues

Extended plays

Korean

Japanese

References

Discographies
Discographies of South Korean artists
Pop music discographies
Rock music discographies
Rhythm and blues discographies